Ceratitella is a genus of tephritid  or fruit flies in the family Tephritidae.

Species
 Ceratitella bifasciata
 Ceratitella inthanona
 Ceratitella loranthi
 Ceratitella nitida
 Ceratitella recondita
 Ceratitella schlingeri
 Ceratitella tomentosa

References

External links

 
Dacinae
Tephritidae genera